Limnophila sessiliflora, known as dwarf ambulia, ambulis, and Asian marshweed is a flowering plant in the family Plantaginaceae.

Synonyms

Ambulia
Ambulia sessiliflora; Hottonia sessiliflora; Stemodia sessiliflora; Terebinthina sessiliflora; Stemodiacra sessiliflora

Distribution

S.E. Asia
Escaped into a number of countries where conditions are suitable and sometimes classified as a weed - in paddy rice fields of India, China, Japan and the Philippines.
Now is naturalized in several counties in Florida, from south Florida to the Florida Panhandle.
Some species are native to Australia.

Ecology
Very adaptable; has been found growing in mountain streams, lakes, rivers and even damp soils.

Description

Looks superficially rather similar to Cabomba but it has leaves in proper whorls, about 1.2 inches (3 cm) in diameter. The leaves are pinnate and bright green in colour. Under strong light the leaves take on a reddish hue. When the plant has received enough light for the day, the whorls of leaves tend to close up and "go to sleep". Can reach over 16 inches (40 cm) in height. The submerse leaves are very different from the emerse forms - dark green, more or less lance-shaped.

The fruit are capsules, ellipsoid, 3.5-5.5 mm long, green-brown when submersed, dark brown when emersed.

Cultivation

Quite commonly used as a bunch plant in aquariums. Needs medium light (more light results in better growth and appearance) and a nutrient-rich water column. Benefits from the addition of CO2. Like many stem plants, it tends to take on a leggy growth in poor light.

Propagated by cuttings.

Growth conditions: 
Ph 6–7.5 
3-25 dGH 
3-25 dKH
Temperature 22 - 28'C

A nutrient-rich substrate also benefits the plant.

References

 Biswas D, Calder CC. 1955. Handbook of Common Water and Marsh Plants of India and Buram. Health Bull. 24, Delhi, 47 pp. 
 Dutta NM. 1975. A Revision of the genus Limnophila of eastern India. Bull. Bot. Soc. Bengal. 29:1-7 
 Gilbert KM. 1984. A review of the aquatic plants Limnophila heterophylla and Limnophila sessiliflora. Bureau of Aquatic Plant Research and Control Dept. of Natural Resources. 12 pp. 
 Mahler MJ. 1980. Limnophila, a new exotic pest. Aquatics 2:4-7 
 Philcox D. 1970. A taxonomic revision of the genus Limnophila R. Br. (scrophulariaceae). Kew Bull. 24(1):101-170 
 Rataj K, Horeman TJ. 1977. Aquarium Plants. T.F. H. Publications: Neptune City. 
 Sculthorpe CD. 1967. The Biology of Aquatic Vascular Plants. Edward Arnold Publ. Ltd.: London. 610 pp. 
 Spencer W, Bowes G. 1985. Limnophila and Hygrophila: a review and physiological assessment of their weed potential in Florida. J. Aq. Pl. Manag. 23:7-16 
 Yamazaki T. 1985. A revision of the genera Limnophila and Torenia from Indochina. Journ. Fac. Sci. Univ. Todyo. III 13: 575-624 
 Yang YP, Yen SH. 1997. Notes on Limnophila (scrophulariaceae) of Taiwan. Botanical Bulletin of Academia Sinica. pp. 285–294

External links

 Tropica
 Univ of Florida
 Univ of Florida

Plantaginaceae
Flora of Asia